Mountain View Elementary School may refer to:

Mountainview Elementary School
Mountain View Elementary School (Coquitlam)
Mountain View Elementary School (Nanaimo)
Mountain View Elementary School (Revelstoke)
Mountain View Elementary School (Sparwood, British Columbia)
Mountain View Elementary School (Collingwood, Ontario)
Mountain View Elementary School (Goleta, California)
Mountain View Elementary School (Ontario, California)
Mountain View Elementary School (Visalia, California)
Mountain View Elementary School (Harrisonburg, Virginia)
 Mountainview Elementary School (Otterburn Park, Quebec)